Les Bans (3,669 m) is a mountain in the Massif des Écrins in the Dauphiné Alps, first climbed by W. A. B. Coolidge, Christian Almer and U. Almer on July 14, 1878.

There are three main summits on the mountain:

 South summit 3,669 m
 North-west summit 3,630 m
 North summit 3,662 m

Huts
 Chalet Hôtel du Gioberney (1,700 m)
 Les Bans hut (2,076 m)
 Pilatte refuge (2,580 m)

Gallery

External links
 Les Bans on SummitPost

Mountains of the Alps
Alpine three-thousanders
Mountains of Hautes-Alpes
Mountains of Isère